Diastella myrtifolia, the Tulbagh silkypuff, is a flower-bearing shrub that belongs to the genus Diastella and forms part of the fynbos. The plant is native to the Western Cape and is found in the Groot Winterhoek. The shrub is erect to semi-erect with mat-shaped spreading branches.

References

External links 

myrtifolia
Flora of South Africa